The Bayano Dam is a dam on the Bayano River in Darién Province, Panama. The dam was built in 1976; its construction flooded approximately 350 square kilometers of rainforest, displacing thousands of indigenous residents. The flooded area is now Bayano Lake. The dam is the second-largest power source in Panama.

See also
Fortuna Dam, the dam in Panama that generates the most power.

References

External links
Photo of Bayano Dam

Dams in Panama
Buildings and structures in Darién Province
Dams completed in 1976